The Pelican Women's Championship is a women's professional golf tournament in Florida on the LPGA Tour. A new event in 2020, it was played at Pelican Golf Club in Belleair near Tampa.

Nelly Korda won the 2021 event in a playoff over defending champion Kim Sei-young, Lexi Thompson, and Lydia Ko. 

The 2022 event was scheduled to be held November 10–13, but the Thursday, November 10 start date was eliminated due to the approach of Tropical Storm Nicole with rain and strong winds, so the tournament was shortened to 54 holes. 

The storm hit with its  wind, and  rain blew through the area on Thursday. The sand base of the land and the crew's extraordinary work over the 12 hours between the LPGA notice to the players at 5:30pm on Thursday and the proposed 6:55am start on Friday, was praised by the players on how unbelievably good shape the course was in, also given the remarkable lack of debris. The reason for the lack of standing water is this course is so close to the Gulf of Mexico, rain sinks straight down to the water table line.

Winners

Tournament record

References

External links
Coverage on the LPGA Tour's official site

Former LPGA Tour events
Golf in Florida
Recurring sporting events established in 2020
Recurring sporting events disestablished in 2021
2020 establishments in Florida
2021 disestablishments in Florida
Women's sports in Florida